The Estonian Science Photo Competition (Estonian: teadusfoto võistlus) is a photography competition that aims to popularize science and make more science related images freely available.

It has acted as an inspiration for European Science Photo Competition first held in 2015 and Wiki Science Competition first held in 2017.

History 
The competition was first held in 2006 (image collection process started already in 2005). In 2006 and 2007 it was organized by an Estonian science journalist Tiit Kändler.

It was relaunched in 2011 and organized by wikipedian Ivo Kruusamägi. It was now held in Wikipedia and the submitted images were given under free licence. Competition also took place in 2012 and 2013.

In 2015 this event was held as a part of European Science Photo Competition. This contest involved 40 countries, over 2,200 people, and nearly 10,000 images. This was again organized by Ivo Kruusamägi and it won the 2nd prize of Estonian Science Communication Award in the category of science and technology communication via audio-visual and electronic media.

In 2017 it was held as a worldwide Wiki Science Competition and it once again collected around 10,000 images.

Maxim Bilovitskiy from Estonia also won the Non-photographic media category in the European Science Photo Competition 2015 and in Wiki Science Competition 2017.

Winners 
 2006 – Ivar Jüssi
 2007 – Heiti Paves
 2011 – Timo Palo
 2012 – Toomas Jagomäe
 2013 – Heiti Paves
 2015 – Tavo Romann
 2017 – Kertu Liis Krigul
 2019 – Tavo Romann
 2021 – Peeter Paaver

Example images

References

External links

Photography in Estonia
2006 establishments in Estonia